The streaked shearwater (Calonectris leucomelas) is a species of seabird.  The adult bird averages  in length, with a  wingspan.

Description
The streaked shearwater feeds mainly on fish and squid.  It follows fishing boats, attracted to anchovy crawls off Japan and has been known to be taken as by-catch in nets or drowned when ingesting the bait on long-line fishing lines.

The streaked shearwater nests in burrows.  It prefers forested hills.

This bird is abundant and widespread; however, some mortality occurs through becoming entangled in fishing nets, and from some predation by cats and rats.  In addition, it is harvested by some traditional endemic human cultures.

Distribution
This species is pelagic, but is also found in inshore waters.  It occurs in the Pacific Ocean, nesting in Japan and the Korean Peninsula, predominantly on their offshore islands. After breeding, the streaked shearwater migrate south, feeding in the seas off northern New Guinea, the Arafura Sea, and the South China Sea.  Calonectris leucomelas have also been reported well off the west coast of the United States, from the southern coast of India, and from New Zealand.

Notes

References

Further reading
 
  Seabirds, an Identification Guide by Peter Harrison, (1983) 
 Handbook of the Birds of the World Vol 1,  Josep del Hoyo editor,

External links 

 BirdLife species factsheet
 Oiseaux photo

streaked shearwater
Birds of the Philippines
Birds of Japan
Birds of Palau
Birds of the Pacific Ocean
streaked shearwater
Articles containing video clips